("The evening sky"), WAB 55, is a song composed by Anton Bruckner in 1862.

History 
Bruckner composed this first setting of "evening song" Der Abendhimmel in January 1862. He used for the composition a text of Joseph Christian von Zedlitz, which he would also use for a second setting of the song in 1866. Bruckner dedicated the song to the men's quartet Anton Munsch (1st tenor), Anton Stiefler (2nd tenor), Eduard Benoni (1st bass) and Mathias Weissmann (2nd bass).

The piece was performed first in a transcription for men's choir by the Liedertafel Frohsinn on 4 July 1900.

The original manuscript is stored in the archive of Österreichische Nationalbibliothek. It was first issued in Band III/2, pp. 18–20 of the Göllerich/Auer biography.

Text 

Der Abendhimmel is using a text of Joseph Christian von Zedlitz.

Music 
The 38-bar long work in 6/8 is in A-flat major. It is scored for  quartet a cappella.

Discography 

There are two recordings of Der Abendhimmel, WAB 55:
 Guido Mancusi, Chorus Viennensis, Musik, du himmlisches Gebilde! – CD: ORF CD 73, 1995
 Thomas Kerbl, Quartet of the Männerchorvereinigung Bruckner 08, Anton Bruckner – Männerchöre – CD: LIVA 027, 2008

References

Sources 
 August Göllerich, Anton Bruckner. Ein Lebens- und Schaffens-Bild,  – posthumous edited by Max Auer by G. Bosse, Regensburg, 1932
 Anton Bruckner – Sämtliche Werke, Band XXIII/2:  Weltliche Chorwerke (1843–1893), Musikwissenschaftlicher Verlag der Internationalen Bruckner-Gesellschaft, Angela Pachovsky and Anton Reinthaler (Editor), Vienna, 1989
 Uwe Harten, Anton Bruckner. Ein Handbuch. , Salzburg, 1996. .
 Cornelis van Zwol, Anton Bruckner 1824–1896 – Leven en werken, uitg. Thoth, Bussum, Netherlands, 2012. 
 Crawford Howie, Anton Bruckner - A documentary biography, online revised edition

External links 
 
  
 Der Abendhimmel As-Dur, WAB 55 – Critical discography by Hans Roelofs 
 A live performance (20 February 2022) by Y Kawaguchi by overdubbing his voice: Der Abendhimmel

Weltliche Chorwerke by Anton Bruckner
1862 compositions
Compositions in A-flat major